Pouteria cubensis is a species of plant in the family Sapotaceae. It is endemic to Cuba.

References

cubensis
Endemic flora of Cuba
Endangered flora of North America
Taxonomy articles created by Polbot
Taxa named by Charles Baehni